Indosylvirana serendipi, or the Sri Lankan golden-backed frog, is a species of frog in the family Ranidae. It is endemic to Sri Lanka.

Description
Body slender and head small. Supertympanic ridge absent. Subarticular tubercles prominent on toes. Third toe webbing extends up to the disc on the outside. Loreal region acute. Vomerine ridge present. Dermal fringe present. Dorsum reddish-brown with black. Tympanum area dark brown. Upper lip with a white stripe. Iris reddish brown with golden specks and dark patches. Flanks light yellowish-gray. Light brown limbs with grayish cross-bands. Ventrum whitish. Throat and limbs light grey. Male has a nuptial pad.

Distribution
The frog is point endemic, where specimen only found from Kudawa araa of Sinharaja rain forest.

Ecology
Its natural habitats are tropical lowland evergreen forests, banks of streams and in marshy areas.

References

serendipi
Frogs of Sri Lanka
Endemic fauna of Sri Lanka
Amphibians described in 1829
Taxa named by Sathyabhama Das Biju